The 2011 Grand National (officially known as the John Smith's Grand National for sponsorship reasons) was the 164th renewal of the Grand National horse race that took place at Aintree near Liverpool, England.

The showpiece steeplechase began at 4:15 pm BST on 9 April 2011, the final day of the three-day annual meeting. The maximum permitted field of forty runners competed for prize money totalling a record £950,000, making it the highest valued National Hunt race in the United Kingdom.

Nineteen of the forty participants completed the 4½-mile course; of the 21 who did not, two suffered fatal falls on the first circuit, reigniting debates over the safety of the event. Irish horse Ballabriggs won the race, securing the first-place prize money of £535,135 and a first Grand National win for trainer Donald McCain, Jr., the son of four-time winning trainer Ginger McCain. Owned by Trevor Hemmings, Ballabriggs was ridden by Irish jockey Jason Maguire and was sent off at odds of 14/1. The pairing completed the race in 9 minutes 1.2 seconds, the second-fastest time in Grand National history.

Race card 
On 2 February 2011 Aintree released the names of 102 horses submitted to enter, including 34 Irish-trained and three French-trained horses. Ten were trained by Paul Nicholls, including a leading contender in Niche Market; nine were handled by Irish trainer Willie Mullins, and three by Jonjo O'Neill, the trainer of last year's winner. Ballabriggs, another leading contender, was trained by Donald McCain, Jr., the son of Ginger McCain who trained Red Rum to three National victories in the 1970s and returned with another winner, Amberleigh House, in 2004.

20 contenders were withdrawn in the first scratchings. After a second scratchings deadline on 24 March 74 horses remained on the list of entrants, with the top weight handicap of 11 st 10 lb allocated to last year's winner Don't Push It. The official odds on 24 March placed Mullins-trained The Midnight Club at 10/1 favourite. Backstage and Oscar Time were given joint-second favourite odds of 12/1.

At the five-day deadline on 4 April, nine further withdrawals since the second scratchings left a total of 65 contenders still in the running to compete. Nina Carberry, the sister of 1999 winner Paul Carberry, became the first female jockey to take a third ride in the Grand National. Four amateur jockeys lined up to compete. Official odds on favourite The Midnight Club were cut to 8/1, while What A Friend replaced Oscar Time as a joint-second favourite with Backstage on odds of 11/1.

On 7 April, Aintree declared the final confirmed list of 40 runners and four reserves as follows. The reserves would replace any withdrawals prior to 9 am on 8 April. None of the reserves, however, were required.

*Barry Geraghty rode Or Noir de Somoza after his original jockey, Tom Scudamore, withdrew due to an injury sustained in a race the day prior to the National.

Finishing order

Ten-year-old Ballabriggs led for much of the race, and the gelding eventually saw off a strong run-in challenge from amateur jockey Sam Waley-Cohen on Oscar Time who secured second place. Third was 2010 winner Tony McCoy on Don't Push It, twelve lengths behind the second. 15/2 favourite The Midnight Club made a mistake at the third fence and finished sixth.

State of Play, the eleven-year-old 28/1 shot trained by Welshman Evan Williams, finished in the top four for the third successive National.

Nineteen runners completed the course, including three of the six 100/1 shots. This was the highest number of finishers since 2005 when twenty-one horses passed the finishing post.

Non-finishers

Ten horses fell during the race, four unseated their riders, two were brought down by other fallers and five were pulled up.

The 100/1 outsider Santa's Son had led the field over the Canal Turn, but the short-distance runner eventually fell out of contention and jockey Jamie Moore pulled him up before the 27th fence. Killyglen fell at the 27th, having been close to leader Ballabriggs at the beginning of the second circuit.

Ornais and Dooneys Gate both suffered fatal falls on the first circuit. Ornais incurred a cervical fracture at the fourth fence (a plain 4 ft 10-inch obstacle) and Dooneys Gate fractured his thoracolumbar at fence six (the 5 ft Becher's Brook). Aintree had made significant modifications to its National Course in recent years, including improving veterinary facilities and reducing the severity of some fences, but another notable change was highlighted in this race – that the course has been widened to allow more fences to be bypassed if necessary. As the remaining contenders on the second circuit approached the 20th fence, arrowed signposts and marshals waving chequered flags signalled them to bypass on the outside as Ornais' body was covered by a tarpaulin on the landing side. Two jumps later and they were again diverted, this time around the famous Becher's Brook, where veterinary staff attended to Dooneys Gate. This was the first time since the modern course was finalised in the 1880s that only 28 fences were jumped.

Broadcasting
The Grand National has the status of being an event of significant national interest within the United Kingdom and thus is listed on the Ofcom Code on Sports and Other Listed and Designated Events. The race therefore must be covered live on free-to-air terrestrial television in the UK. The BBC aired the race on radio for the 80th consecutive year and on television for the 52nd year.

Clare Balding presented the BBC's television coverage, supported by Rishi Persad and retired jockey Richard Pitman, which was broadcast on BBC One and, for the second year, BBC HD. Former National-winning jockeys Richard Dunwoody and Mick Fitzgerald provided expert analysis, while betting news was provided by Gary Wiltshire and John Parrott. Suzi Perry was due to be providing soundbites from spectators but did not take part in the programme. Her place was taken by last-minute replacement Dan Walker who had been at Aintree to present Football Focus, aired prior to the National.

The race commentary team was led by Jim McGrath, who called the winner home for the 14th consecutive year; he was supported by Ian Bartlett and Darren Owen.

As well as being streamed to UK viewers on BBC Online, BBC Radio 5 Live also aired the race, presented by Mark Chapman.

The BBC later received some criticism for failing to mention the deaths of Ornais and Dooneys Gate until the end of its broadcast.

Quotes
Selected quotes of participating jockeys speaking after the race:

Jason Maguire (Ballabriggs, 1st): "He loved it... I got him to the front to get him relaxed and put breathers into him and that helped him get the trip."
Sam Waley-Cohen (Oscar Time, 2nd): "The plan was always to come with one smooth run. We knew he had a huge jump in him so I was just trying to get him to pop a little bit and save and not get too keen. He did everything I asked of him."
Tony McCoy (Don't Push It, 3rd): "He ran a great race and all credit to the horse. He was off the bridle a little bit early and he got a little bit low at a couple of fences late on which was energy-sapping."
Paul Moloney (State of Play, 4th): "He's an incredible horse – he's just a little bit slower this year because time is catching up with him. He couldn't lay up with the pace and the ground was probably a little slower than ideal, but he's a fabulous horse."
Harry Skelton (Niche Market, 5th): "He ran an absolute blinder and has given me a tremendous ride."
Denis O'Regan (King Fontaine, 11th): "My horse ran a blinder. I was a bit slow earlier and nearly got brought down. He jumped like a buck. He's only a novice and will be an ideal spin next year."
Andrew McNamara (Bluesea Cracker, 14th): "The ground was a bit quick for her."
Nina Carberry (Character Building, 15th): "I was nearly brought down at Becher's and that was his race over."
Hadden Frost (Calgary Bay, fell at the 4th fence): "He jumped the fence fine, but landed a bit steep, which any horse could do. We were just behind Ballabriggs at the time so we were in the right place. Maybe we'll come back and try again."
Robbie McNamara (Majestic Concorde, unseated rider at 24th): "We were too keen early. I was just starting to get him switched off when we came into the Canal Turn and got in too close and tipped up."
Timmy Murphy (Comply or Die, pulled up before 28th): "I would say that's his last race. He got very tired and he's not getting any younger, but he's a special horse to me and it's nice to think he's ended up at the course where we achieved our finest hour."

Aftermath
The unusually warm and sunny weather conditions were credited with helping the 2011 meeting set a Grand National attendance record. A crowd of 70,291 people attended the main Saturday race day, and a total of 153,583 attended over the course of the three-day meeting, beating the previous record of 151,660 set in 2005.

The Grand National is always a major event for bookmakers, particularly in the United Kingdom. An estimated £300 million in bets were said to have been placed on the 2011 race, including some from as far afield as Australia, Bermuda and Kazakhstan, with British troops in Afghanistan also joining in. It is estimated that nearly half of the adult population of the UK bets on the Grand National.

The race received a significant amount of negative media coverage over the two equine fatalities, which were more publicly noticeable than in prior Nationals due to two fences being bypassed for the first time. Those watching the race on television were given clear views of the tarpaulin-covered body of Ornais at the fourth fence, and an aerial shot at Becher's showed veterinary staff attending to the fatally injured Dooneys Gate, while the remaining runners diverted around them.

Andrew Taylor, director of the animal rights group Animal Aid, called for an outright ban of the Grand National, saying: "It's a deliberately hazardous, challenging and predictably lethal event." The RSPCA's equine consultant David Muir stated: "I was gutted that two horses died... What I will do now is go back and have a look at each element, with the BHA and the racecourse management, to see if the jump contributed to what happened, look at the take-off and landing side and so on, and see if the evidence suggests something can be done about it. I'm trying to make the race better, safer where I can, but the one thing I can never do is eliminate risk: that's always going to be there." Muir did however add: "There's no way I'm going to get the National banned."

Aintree's managing director Julian Thick said: "We are desperately sad at the accidents during the running of the Grand National today and our thoughts go out to the connections of Ornais and Dooneys Gate... Only the best horses and the best jockeys are allowed to enter and all horses are inspected by the vet when they arrive at Aintree to ensure that they are fit to race. This year we had 20 horse-catchers, at least two attendants at each of the 16 fences, four stewards to inspect the course, two BHA course inspectors, ten vets, 50 ground staff and 35 ground repair staff... We work closely with animal welfare organisations, such as the RSPCA and World Horse Welfare, to make sure we are up to date with the latest thinking and research... and to make sure that the horses are looked after properly and that the race is run as safely as possible."

Veteran trainer Ginger McCain queried the suggestion of reducing the size of the fences in the aftermath of the race. McCain said: "You don't make things better by making it easier. Its speed that does the damage." Champion jockey Tony McCoy also defended the National, saying, "I personally don't think the sport could be in any better shape for horses or jockeys." Ornais's owner, Andy Stewart, later said: "We're still grieving but I think this whole hyped up situation regarding the Grand National is totally wrong... National Hunt racing is safer and compliant with every single sport that goes along. My son snowboarded in France and, unfortunately, he had an accident and he'll never walk again. Why don't we just get on with it and enjoy the sport?"

Winning jockey Jason Maguire was subsequently handed a five-day ban by the stewards for excessive use of the whip on Ballabriggs.

See also 
Horseracing in Great Britain
List of British National Hunt races
2011 Cheltenham Gold Cup

References 

2011
Grand National
Grand National
21st century in Merseyside
Grand
April 2011 sports events in the United Kingdom